St Martin-by-Looe is a coastal civil parish in south Cornwall, England, United Kingdom. The parish is immediately east of the town and parish of Looe, seven miles (11 km) south of Liskeard. The parish is in the Liskeard Registration District and the population in the 2001 census was 321, which had increased to 429 at the 2011 census.

To the north, the parish is bordered by Morval parish, to the east by Deviock parish, to the west by Looe parish and to the south by the English Channel. Until 1845 the parish also included East Looe.

The parish church of St Martin stands outside the civil parish in the hamlet of St Martin at  about a mile north of Looe town centre. Its Norman doorway is built of Tartan Down stone and probably dates from about 1140. The interior of the church is of typically 15th-century appearance, but parts of the building are considerably older.

Thomas Bond, the topographer is buried in the churchyard. Jonathan Toup, classical scholar, was presented on 28 July 1750 to the rectory of St Martin and held it until his death in 1785.

A stone cross was found at Tregoad Farm in 1906 built into the wall of a stable. In 1931 it was set up on a new base at Tregoad by the Looe Old Cornwall Society. In 1971 it was removed to the Guildhall Museum in East Looe for preservation. It is a rare example in east Cornwall of a cross with a carved figure of Christ, in this case incised.

Pendrym

The manor of Pendrim was a manor with lands in this parish and in others. It was recorded in the Domesday Book (1086) as having land for 6 ploughs, one virgate in lordship, one plough, 3 serfs, 13 smallholders with one plough, 200 acres of pasture and half a square league of woodland. It was held by King William and paid £3 by weight. Three lands from this manor had been taken from it and were then held by the canons of St Stephen's by Launceston from Robert, Count of Mortain; these were Bodigga, Bucklawren and Bonyalva. In these lands were 10 ploughs and the value was 20 shillings (formerly 40 shillings). The name is now spelled Pendrym and it is located close to the church of St Martin. The name is Cornish and means "ridge top" (drum = ridge; pen = top).

References

External links

Civil parishes in Cornwall